Porto Velho (Old Port) is the capital of the Brazilian state of Rondônia, in the upper Amazon River basin, and a Catholic Metropolitan Archbishopric. The population is 548,952 people (as of the IBGE 2021 estimation). Located on the border of Rondônia and the state of Amazonas, the town is an important trading center for cassiterite, the mining of which represents the most important economic activity in the region, as well as a transportation and communication center. It is on the eastern shore of the Madeira River, one of the main tributaries of the Amazon River. It is also Rondônia's largest city, and the largest state capital of Brazil by area.

The municipality occupies most of the border between Amazonas and Rondônia, and is both the westernmost and northernmost city in the state.

History 

Officially founded on October 2, 1914, Porto Velho was founded by pioneers around 1907, during the construction of the Madeira-Mamoré railroad. After the railroad was completed, the local population was about one thousand inhabitants; its buildings were chiefly the railway's installations and the wooden houses of the Caribbean (mainly Barbadian) workers - hence the name of the town's largest district by then, "Bajan Hill" or "Barbados Town", nowadays called the "Alto do Bode".

During the first sixty years, the city's development was directly connected to the railway's activities. The town prospered during the rubber boom, but then when low-cost Malaysian rubber made rubber from the Amazon uncompetitive, the region's economy ground to a halt. Cities like Santo Antônio do Madeira, which had a tram line and a weekly newspaper by the time of Porto Velho's foundation, are nothing but ruins nowadays.

Porto Velho's survival is associated with the better conditions of the area where it was built, its easy access by the river and its harbor: these were all considerations in the choice of Porto Velho as the capital of the newly formed Federal Territory of Guaporé, in 1943. Only with the beginning of World War II was there another cycle of progress in the region. When the Allied forces lost control over the Malaysian rubber, Amazon's was needed due to the war effort. This produced what is known in Brazil as the "second rubber boom". But when the war ended, the region's economy once again came to a halt.

Porto Velho's modern history begins with the discovery of cassiterite around the city, and of gold on the Madeira River, at the end of the 1950s. In addition, the government's decision to allow large cattle farms in the territory began a trend of migration into the city. Almost one million people moved to Rondônia, and Porto Velho's population increased to three hundred thousand. This intense migration caused much trouble for the city. Among many other problems, the suburban boroughs, for example, are nothing but shanty towns.

Its Catedral Metropolitana Sagrado Coração de Jesus, is the cathedral archiepiscopal see of a Latin Catholic jurisdiction that started on May 1, 1925 as the vast Amazonian Territorial Prelature of Porto Velho on territories split off from the then Diocese of Amazonas and Diocese of São Luíz de Cáceres and lost parts of it to three new Territorial prelatures before being promoted first bishopric (Diocese of Porto Velho) and on October 4, 1982 promoted as Metropolitan Archdiocese of Porto Velho.

Geography

Climate
Porto Velho features a tropical monsoon climate (climate type Am) under the Köppen climate classification. The temperatures tend to be relatively consistent throughout the course of the year, with average daily temperatures typically between 25 and 26 degrees Celsius. The dry season is short and covers the months of June, July and August.

Vegetation

The Amazon has over half of the planet's remaining rainforests and is the largest and most species-rich tract of tropical rainforest in the world. Wet tropical forests are the most species-rich biome, and tropical forests in the Americas are consistently more species-rich than wet forests in Africa and Asia.  As the largest tract of tropical rainforest in the Americas, the Amazonian rainforests have unparalleled biodiversity.

More than one third of all species in the world live in the Amazon Rainforest.

Conservation

The municipality contains what is left of the Rio Madeira Sustainable Yield Forest (B) and (C), created in 1990.
It contains the  Lago do Cuniã Extractive Reserve, created in 1999.
It contains part of the strictly-protected Cuniã Ecological Station, an area of savannah parkland.
It holds all of the strictly protected  Serra dos Três Irmãos Ecological Station.
It contains part of the Mapinguari National Park, a  conservation unit created in 2008.
It also contains part of the  Jacundá National Forest, a sustainable use conservation unit.
The municipality contains 66% of the  Jaci Paraná Extractive Reserve, created in 1996.
It contains the  Mujica Nava Ecological Station, created in 1996.
It contains part of the Bom Futuro National Forest, established in 1988.
The majority of the forest surrounding Porto Velho has been cut down, however.

Economy
The GDP for the city was R$3,656,512,000 (2005).

The per capita income for the city was R$9,779 (2005).

Cityscape

Transportation

International Airport

Porto Velho International Airport, 7 km from the city, has its main access at the Av. Governador Jorge Teixeira de Oliveira, with two lanes. Buses from downtown run to the airport every hour, and there is a fleet of taxis serving only the airport. The airport is served by 98 scheduled flights weekly, most going to other large Brazilian cities. The presence of Porto Velho Air Force Base ensures considerable movement of military aircraft. The local people refer to Porto Velho International as Belmont Airport because it is located in this district. It became an international airport in 2002. It was built as a replacement to Caiari Airport, which was closed on April 16, 1969.

Porto Velho Air Force Base - ALA6, one of their most important bases of the Brazilian Air Force, is located in Porto Velho.

Highways

BR-174;
BR-317;
BR-319;
BR-364;
BR-421;
BR-425;
BR-429;
RO-010;
RO-101;
RO-490.

Education

Well-known Colleges
 Universidade Federal de Rondônia (Unir);
 Federal Institute of Education, Science and Technology of Rondônia - Instituto Federal de Educação, Ciência e Tecnologia de Rondônia (IFRO);
 Instituto Luterano de Ensino Superior de Porto Velho (Iles-Ulbra);
 Faculdade Interamericana de Porto Velho (Uniron);
 Faculdade de Ciências Administrativas e de Tecnologia (Fatec-RO);
 Faculdade de Ciências Humanas, Exatas e Letras de Rondônia (Faro);
 Faculdade da Amazônia (Iesa);
 Faculdade de Porto Velho/ Fundação Getúlio Vargas (FIP/FGV);
 Faculdades Integradas Maria Coelho Aguiar (FIMCA);
 Faculdade São Lucas;

Well-known Schools
 Maple Bear Canadian School;
 Colégio Sapiens;
 Classe A;
 Escola Estadual de Ensino Fundamental e Médio João Bento da Costa;
 Colégio Tiradentes da Polícia Militar;
 Centro de Ensino Mineiro;
 Proensino;
 Instituto Laura Vicuña;
 Instituto Estadual de Educação Carmela Dutra;
 Colégio Dom Bosco;
 Centro Educacional Dr Gilberto Mendes De Azevedo;
 Instituto Maria Auxiliadora.

Culture

The culture of Porto Velho is marked by a strong Northeastern influence with Bumba Meu Boi, the Juninas and Pastorinha peoples, and some influences of south central Brazil. The interpretation of Native American legends, such as the Iara, the Boto and Mapinguari folklore, influenced by migrants. As for handicrafts, there are various exhibitions of indigenous works, utilities and adornment using raw materials like clay, vines, bamboo and rubber. The Artisan's House serves as a support to the initiatives of the genre.

Libraries

The collection of library articles in municipal Porto Velho was waiting for a permanent headquarters for several years until completion of the Municipal Library next to City Hall. The space has two air-conditioned floors in the city center.

Carnival
The Carnival takes place every year, attracting a large number of people from other cities and neighboring states of Rondônia. During the carnival, there are the parades of carnival and samba schools; among the best known are The Diplomats, Asfaltão, among others.

In July Carnival happens out of season, with characteristics of the Bahia Carnival, with electric trios and 'Axé' groups.

Theatres
Two theaters enliven the cultural sector: The Municipal Theater, Avenida Nabuco (center) and Theatre Uirassu Rodrigues, Jose Bonifacio Street.

Museums

The railway complex is located the Museum of Railroad Madeira-Mamore, in the city center. Within it lies the State Museum, with abundant material on archeology, ethnology and Mineralogy.

Museum of Railroad Madeira-Mamore
The Museum is housed in a warehouse that was used for loading and unloading for almost a century. One can see hundreds of materials in this preserved railway. The museum has several pieces from the time of its construction and operation. Besides the first locomotive brought to the Amazon, the Coronel Church, there is also a 'stork and a tricycle', used to transport the line foremen who checked lathes, machines, furniture, as well as photographs of workers, books, documents and more. The museum is located at Avenida September 7 - Railroad Square Madeira-Mamore. Outside the museum, on the waterfront, you can take a ride in one of the "barges" to Teotônio waterfall.

Monuments

The Three Boxes Water

Also known as The Three Marias, the water tanks are in the center of town, in the square of the same name. The first was erected in 1910 and the other two in 1912. They were designed and built by Chicago Bridge & Iron Works of Chicago as per information contained in cast-iron plate, carved pilasters on each of them. There are three cylindrical tanks, covered with metal sheets in a conical shape, with a concave-shaped base. Each tank is elevated from the ground by four columns made of iron lattice on concrete foundations. They are at the height of the bulge surrounded by a walkway railing with metal lattice through which arrives via a ladder. Each reservoir has a capacity for 200,000 liters and supplied the city of Porto Velho by the year 1957, working as gravity-fed reservoirs.

The Cathedral of the Sacred Heart of Jesus

The Cathedral had its construction initiated in 1917, but was completed only ten years later because of difficulties in transporting material. Original paintings of a religious nature inside the Cathedral, were executed by Father Angelo Cerri and Alfonso Liguori. The stained glass windows that surround it, with the themes of the Cross, were all donated by the community-velhense port.

Sport
The city currently has seven football teams: CF Amazônia, Cruzeiro EC, Porto Velho EC, SC Genus de Porto Velho, SC Shallon, Moto EC and Rondoniense SC. In the past the city was also home to Ferroviário AC, CR Flamengo, São Domingos EC, and Ypiranga EC before these clubs folded. All clubs share the one stadium in the city, the Aluizão, named after Aluízio Ferreira, with a smaller ground Saldanão also available.

References

External links

 Prefeitura Municipal de Porto Velho (official page of Porto Velho)
 Unofficial page of Porto Velho history
 Twitter
 Facebook

 
Populated places established in 1914
Municipalities in Rondônia